Kosmos 135 ( meaning Cosmos 135), also known as DS-U2-MP No.1, was a Soviet satellite which was launched in 1966 as part of the Dnepropetrovsk Sputnik programme. It was a  spacecraft, which was built by the Yuzhnoye Design Office, and was used to investigate micrometeoroids and particles of dust in space.

A Kosmos-2I 63SM carrier rocket was used to launch Kosmos 135 into low Earth orbit. The launch took place from Site 86/1 at Kapustin Yar. The launch occurred at 20:37:59 GMT on 12 December 1966, and resulted in the successful insertion of the satellite into orbit. Upon reaching orbit, the satellite was assigned its Kosmos designation, and received the International Designator 1966-112A. The North American Air Defense Command assigned it the catalogue number 02612.

Kosmos 135 was the first of two DS-U2-MP satellites to be launched, the other being Kosmos 163 (5 June 1967). It decayed from its orbit and reentered in the atmosphere on 12 April 1967.

See also

 1966 in spaceflight

References

Spacecraft launched in 1966
Kosmos satellites
1966 in the Soviet Union
Dnepropetrovsk Sputnik program